The U2 is a line of the Hamburg U-Bahn which has a length of . It serves 25 stations. The line opened in 1913. It starts in Niendorf Nord and leads via the city center at Hauptbahnhof Nord to Mümmelmannsberg.

History

The first part of the line was opened on 21 October 1913 from Schlump to Emilienstraße. In 1914 it was extended to Hellkamp, a station which was closed and dismantled in 1964 and in 1965 replaced by new station Lutterothstraße. In 2009 eastern parts of U2 and U3 lines were swapped behind Berliner Tor. Before that, the U2 line led to Wandsbek-Gartenstadt. Since then, it ends in Mümmelmannsberg, and the U3 became a ring line again with a branch to Wandsbek-Gartenstadt.

Opening and closing dates
 21 October 1913: Schlump – Emilienstraße 
 23 May 1914: Emilienstraße – Hellkamp 
 1 May 1964: Closure of the line Schlump – Hellkamp for several months because of works at Osterstraße and abandonment of Hellkamp station 
 30 May 1965: (Schlump –) Lutterothstraße 
 30 October 1966: Lutterothstraße – Hagenbecks Tierpark 
 2 January 1967: Berliner Tor – Horner Rennbahn (as U3)
 24 September 1967: Horner Rennbahn – Legienstraße (as U3)
 29 September 1968: Hauptbahnhof Nord – Berliner Tor (as U21)
 28 September 1969: Legienstraße – Billstedt (as U3)
 31 May 1970: Billstedt – Merkenstraße (as U3)
 31 May 1970: Schlump – Gänsemarkt (as U22)
 3 June 1973: Gänsemarkt – Hauptbahnhof Nord
 1 June 1985: Hagenbecks Tierpark – Niendorf Markt 
 29 September 1990: Merkenstraße – Mümmelmannsberg (as U3)
 9 March 1991: Niendorf Markt – Niendorf Nord

Gallery

References

External links 

Hamburg U-Bahn lines
Railway lines opened in 1913
1913 establishments in Germany